Tak Khunn Wang (born 13 October 1991) is a French tennis player.

Wang has a career high ATP singles ranking of 265 achieved on 3 February 2014. He also has a career high doubles ranking of 312 achieved on 15 August 2016. Wang has won 1 ATP Challenger doubles title at the 2016 ZS-Sports China International Challenger.

Tour titles

Doubles

External links
 
 

1991 births
Living people
French male tennis players
Tennis players from Paris
French people of Chinese descent
21st-century French people